Rabi Thapa is a Nepali writer and editor working in English. He is the Editor of La.Lit, the literary magazine from Nepal, and the author of Nothing to Declare (Penguin India, 2011) and Thamel, Dark Star of Kathmandu (Speaking Tiger, 2016). From 2010 to 2011, he was the Editor of the weekly paper, Nepali Times.

Background 
Rabi Thapa published Nothing to Declare (Penguin India), in 2011. This debut collection of short stories was longlisted for the Frank O’Connor International Short Story Award. The following year, Thapa co-founded the literary magazine La.Lit. In 2016, he published Thamel, Dark Star of Kathmandu (Speaking Tiger Books), a cultural history of a historic Kathmandu neighbourhood.

See also
Manjushree Thapa
Samrat Upadhyay

References

21st-century Nepalese writers
Living people
Year of birth missing (living people)
Place of birth missing (living people)
Nepalese male writers
Alumni of the University of Cambridge
Monash University alumni
Nepalese non-fiction writers
Male non-fiction writers
English-language poets from Nepal
English-language writers from Nepal